Srdjan Djokovic (born 25 April 1961) is a Serbian entrepreneur and former professional skier and skiing coach. He is best known as the father of tennis players Novak, Djordje, and Marko Djokovic. Supporting and following his son Novak worldwide, he gained notoriety for several missteps and strong statements in Novak's favor.

Early life and education

Djokovic was born in Kosovska Mitrovica to parents Stanka and Vladimir, and grew up in the nearby town of Zvečan. He has a sister, Jelena, and a younger brother, Goran.After completing high school, he moved to Belgrade to study law, but did not finish the studies. Later on, the whole family moved to Belgrade. During winters, he worked as a ski coach in the winter resorts of Kopaonik and Brezovica, where he met his future wife Dijana in 1986.

Career
Djokovic is a former professional skier and ski coach, who worked in the Kopaonik ski resort. He is currently the owner-operator of the Red Bull pizza restaurant and a sports shop in the Serbian mountains. He opened the restaurant, which has no connection to the drinks company with the same name, in 1999. While some accounts describe Djokovic as a former player at the Kosovo football club KF Trepça, the 2022 book Ein Leben lang im Krieg (English: A lifetime at war) by Daniel Müksch reports a lack of supporting evidence of this.In 2011, Djokovic attempted to unseat Serbia Tennis Federation president Slobodan Živojinović, but ultimately failed to do so.In January 2023, he was seen during the Australian Open tennis tournament near the Rod Laver Arena with a pro-Vladimir Putin motorcycle gang called the Night Wolves. Vasyl Myroshnychenko, the Ukrainian ambassador to Australia, called for Djokovic to be banned from the subsequent tennis match in the competition. Djokovic subsequently stated that he would not attend the January 27 semi-final to avoid disrupting it. Srdjan Djokovic later stated that he did not intend to post with the pro-Russian gangsters and mistakenly thought he was posing for photos with Serbian tennis fans.

Family life

Djokovic is married to Dijana Djokovic. They are the parents of three sons: Novak (born 1987), Marko (born 1991), and Djordje (born 1995). In 2022, Djokovic criticised the Government of Australia for not letting his eldest son, Novak, enter the country due to COVID-19 public health rules. On 6 January, the eve of Orthodox Christmas day, Djokovic compared his son's detention in Australia to the Crucifixion of Jesus.

See also
Damir Dokić

References

Sources

1961 births
Living people
Serbian skiers
Novak Djokovic
Eastern Orthodox Christians from Serbia
People from Mitrovica, Kosovo
Skiing coaches
Restaurateurs
Businesspeople in retailing
People from Belgrade
Serbian businesspeople
Kosovo Serbs
Members of the Serbian Orthodox Church